Emil Franz Adam (20 May 1843, in Munich – 19 January 1924, in Munich) was a German equestrian painter.

Life
Adam was the son of animal painter Benno Adam. He initially intended to devote himself to science, but, carried away by the example of his grandfather, the equestrian painter Albrecht Adam, he decided to be a painter. He studied painting under the guidance of his uncle, the painter Franz Adam, and later under Jean-François Portaels in Brussels. He became one of the last great masters in depicting horses, horse portraits and hunting scenes.

Adam married Josephine Marie, née Wurmb. They had two sons, the painter Richard Benno Adam (1873–1937) and the priest Ernst Adam (1884-1955).

Adam's work consisted primarily of horse paintings, equestrian portraits, and hunting scenes. He was invited, along with his father to Pardubice, Bohemia, in 1867, to paint the hunting club members portrait, a group of 60 people.

Gallery

See also
 List of German painters

Illustrations of works

https://artuk.org/discover/artists/adam-emil-18431924

External links 

 
 Entry for Emil Adam on the Union List of Artist Names

1843 births
1924 deaths
19th-century German painters
19th-century German male artists
German male painters
20th-century German painters
20th-century German male artists
Equine artists
Vanity Fair (British magazine) artists